Datong Prince's Palace, also known as the Residence of Prince Dai (Chinese: 代王府), is a former Ming Dynasty palace in Datong, China. The palace was built in the 14th century for prince Zhu Gui, prince of Dai, the thirteenth son of Zhu Yuanzhang, the first emperor of the Ming Dynasty (1368 - 1644). The palace was similar in construction to the Forbidden City in Beijing, but was constructed 25 years earlier. After prince Zhu Gui, ten other princes followed. The palace was gutted during the social breakdown at the end of the Ming dynasty in 1644, when the peasant rebellion under Li Zicheng reached Datong. At the start of the 21st century, rebuilding started in order to restore the historic center of Datong.

The size of the palace was around 180,000 square metres. It had multiple courtyards and at the center there was the Palace of Eternal Spring. All the palace buildings had jade green rooftops. The gate of benevolence and ritual reminded the princes of their duty to be kind to the people through benevolence, whilst knowing their master through ritual.

Opposite the palace stands a Nine-Dragon Wall, the oldest and biggest (45x8 meters) wall still preserved in China. These types of walls were designed to protect palaces from evil spirits and negative energy.

Bibliography
 Kim Hunter Gordon (2013) "Datong : A Historical Guide", China Atomic Energy Press/ Matric International Publishing - 

Palaces in China
Buildings and structures in Datong